Camerer may mean:

Rudolf Jakob Camerarius, (1665-1721), German botanist and physician (latinization of "Camerer")
Colin Camerer (b. 1959), US economist
Sheila Camerer, South African politician
Wilhelm Camerer, (1842-1910), German pediatrician